Hyalymenus tarsatus, the Texas bow-legged bug, is a species of broad-headed bug in the family Alydidae. It is found in Central America, North America, and South America.

References

Further reading

 
 
 

Alydinae